Mari-Tureksky District (Marij Türek kundem) is an administrative and municipal district (raion), one of the fourteen in the Mari El Republic, Russia. It is located in the east of the republic. Its administrative center is the urban locality (an urban-type settlement) of Mari-Turek. As of the 2010 Census, the total population of the district was 23,155, with the population of Mari-Turek accounting for 22.3% of that number.

Administrative and municipal status
Within the framework of administrative divisions, Mari-Tureksky District is one of the fourteen in the republic. It is divided into one urban-type settlement (an administrative division with the administrative center in the urban-type settlement (inhabited locality) of Mari-Turek) and 5 rural okrugs, all of which comprise 119 rural localities. As a municipal division, the district is incorporated as Mari-Tureksky Municipal District. Mari-Turek Urban-Type Settlement is incorporated into an urban settlement, and the five rural okrugs are incorporated into five rural settlements within the municipal district. The urban-type settlement of Mari-Turek serves as the administrative center of both the administrative and municipal district.

Notable residents 

Vyacheslav Kislitsyn (born 1948), President of Mari El 1997–2001, born in Kosolapovo

References

Notes

Sources

Districts of Mari El
